Centennial is an unincorporated community in Monroe County, West Virginia, United States. Centennial is located on West Virginia Route 3, east of Union.

References

Unincorporated communities in Monroe County, West Virginia
Unincorporated communities in West Virginia